Basler Cup was an international ice hockey tournament for professional men's teams, which was played in Basel, Switzerland between 1950-1965. Originally played in November. The tournament was traditionally attended by the local team EHC Basel. The rest of the clubs were invited by the organizers.

History
The history of Basler Cup dates back to the 30s of the 20th century. The best teams from the highest division of the Swiss ice hockey championship took part in the cup only. In 1950, the tournament became international. First international Basler Cup took place on 17–20 November 1950 year. The first winner of international trophy was the Diavoli Rossoneri Milano (Italy), who won the Lausanne HC (Switzerland) final. Interestingly, just a month later, first International Basler Cup winner Diavoli Rossoneri Milano won their third Spengler Cup.

International Basler Cup winners

References

External links

 HC Diavoli Rossoneri Milano 1950/1951 
 Ice-hockey-stat

Ice hockey in Switzerland
International ice hockey competitions hosted by Switzerland
Sport in Basel